Patriotic Millionaires is a nonpartisan organization of Americans with high net worth who promote the restructuring of the American tax system so that wealthy people pay a greater share of their income in taxes. Patriotic Millionaires was founded in 2010 by Erica Payne to advocate for expiration of the Bush tax cuts. Qualification for membership requires either $1 million in annual income, or more than $5 million in assets.

Some notable members include Lawrence Lessig, Jeffrey Gural, Roberta Kaplan, Chuck Collins, George Zimmer, Norman Lear, and Abigail Disney.

History 
Patriotic Millionaires was originally founded in 2010 by Erica Payne under the name "Patriotic Millionaires for Fiscal Strength". Its purpose was to push for an expiration of the Bush tax cuts during the Presidency of Barack Obama.

In 2010, the group had about 45 members, and by 2011 they had about 150. As of 2019, Patriotic Millionaires had over 200 members.

In 2012, President Obama mobilized support from prominent members of the Patriotic Millionaires group to advocate for the Buffett Rule.

In 2015, Patriotic Millionaires announced a merger with Wealth for the Common Good, which is now part of the organization.

In 2017, the group supported the "March on McDonald's" alongside Movement for Black Lives and Color of Change, in a bid to achieve unionization and a $15 minimum wage at McDonald's.

Positions 
Patriotic Millionaires support a higher minimum wage, a progressive tax system, closing tax loopholes, and reducing the influence of money in politics through campaign finance reform. In addition to opposing the Bush tax cuts, the group opposed the Tax Cuts and Jobs Act of 2017. The group supports a reduction in economic inequality. Members of the group believe that concentration of wealth is "destabilizing" and can lead to violence.

References

External links

Nonpartisan organizations in the United States
Political advocacy groups in the United States
Economic advocacy groups in the United States
Organizations established in 2010
2010 establishments in the United States